Port Discovery, Washington is the historical name of what is now called Discovery Bay, a bay in the U.S. state of Washington on the south side of the Strait of Juan de Fuca, on Washington's Olympic Peninsula. It was also called Port Discovery Bay for some time, a name that can be found on maps from the 1940s and earlier. Port Discovery is also the name of a historically significant community that was located on the bay for roughly a hundred years; it disappeared in the late 20th century, with the collapse of the local timber industry.

The bay
The bay was first visited by Europeans in 1790, during the expedition of Manuel Quimper in the Princesa Real, with Juan Carrasco as pilot. They gave it the name Puerto de Quadra, after Juan Francisco de la Bodega y Quadra, their commander at San Blas. In 1791 Francisco de Eliza used Port Discovery as his base of operations for further explorations.

The name Port Discovery was given by George Vancouver in his 1792 visit to the Strait of Juan de Fuca, and honors his ship the Discovery. Vancouver's landing place was apparently at what was later called Carr Point (also Contractors Point).

The wreck of War Hawk, a clipper ship which burned and sank in 1883, is a popular dive site in the bay, near Mill Point.

The community
In the 19th century, Port Discovery became an important coastal community, centered on a large sawmill that was established in 1858. The settlement called Port Discovery was located at what now is called Mill Point, on the west shore of the bay, to the east of U.S. Highway 101 at what is now Broders Road. This spot is several miles north of the current settlements at the foot of Discovery Bay.

The town at Mill Point dwindled after the closing of the sawmill, and vanished after the later collapse of the local timber industry. Only a couple of houses and an old pier remain at the site, which is private property.

Until around 2008, the prominent remains of another famous sawmill were visible farther down the shore from Mill Point, near what was Maynard, Washington, at the foot of the bay. The romantic, derelict building was adjacent to Highway 101, and was thus seen by every passing motorist; it was one of the most-photographed sites in the area for decades. Many such photos are mislabeled as the Port Discovery mill, although the Maynard mill was built later. By 2010, the building's vestiges were removed, in efforts to restore Discovery Bay salmon and shellfish habitat.

References 

Bays of Washington (state)
Bays of Jefferson County, Washington
History of Washington (state)